Claud Edwin Cleeton (December 11, 1907 – April 16, 1997) was an American physicist notable for his groundbreaking work, with Neal H. Williams, on the microwave spectroscopy of ammonia. This was the groundwork that led to the eventual development of the radar.

Education
In 1935 he completed his PhD at the University of Michigan, under Neal H. Williams, with a thesis entitled:  Electromagnetic-Waves of 1.1 cm Wavelength and the Absorption Spectrum of Ammonia. The 1934 paper by Cleeton and Williams has over 260 citations and was important in the development of microwave spectroscopy.

Career
After obtaining his PhD, Cleeton went to work for the Navy and during World War II he was with the Naval Research Laboratory, where he improved radar systems. After the war, he conceived and developed a space surveillance system that detected Soviet satellites.

Honors
For his wartime efforts, Cleeton received the President's Certificate of Merit from Harry Truman in 1946 and the Meritorious Civilian Service Award the following year. After retiring from the Naval Research Laboratory in 1969, he was awarded the Navy Distinguished Civilian Award and in 1993 the IEEE Microwave Pioneer Award. He held patents on 15 electronic inventions and authored numerous papers in technical journals.

Retirement and death

When he retired, he wrote books on stock trading, and he taught himself to use the computer. Cleeton joined the First United Methodist Church of Bellevue, Washington and wrote computer programs to do the church's bookkeeping. Cleeton also developed computer programs for stock analysis. Cleeton died of heart failure April 16, 1997, at the age of 89.

Cleeton was survived by his wife of 66 years, Mary Ellen; two daughters, Sue Guildi  and Sarah Kakaley.

Books by Cleeton
 Claud E. Cleeton, The Art of Independent Investing, Pearson Education Limited, 1976, 
 Claud E. Cleeton, Strategies for the Option Trader, Wiley & Sons Limited, 1979,

See also 

 Trigonal pyramidal molecular geometry
 Ammonia
 Microwave spectroscopy
 Neal H. Williams

References 

 P. Staecker, "Awards," IEEE Microwave Magazine, Vol. 2,  No. 2,  2001,  p. 123.

Notes

External links 
Cleeton obituary
Cleeton's thesis
Cleeton's patent

1907 births
1997 deaths
University of Michigan alumni
20th-century American physicists
American United Methodists
20th-century Methodists